The Husqvarna Open was a golf tournament on the Swedish Golf Tour. It was held between 1993 and 2008 at Jönköping Golf Club in Jönköping, Sweden.

Winners

Notes

References

Swedish Golf Tour events
Golf tournaments in Sweden
Recurring sporting events established in 1993
Recurring sporting events disestablished in 2008
1993 establishments in Sweden
2008 disestablishments in Sweden